René Charles Gustave Deleris (24 March 1926 – 27 December 2022) was a French rugby union player who played as a centre. In addition to his rugby union career, he worked as a teacher.

Deleris's son, Christian, played rugby as a centre for Paris Université Club and Tarbes Pyrénées Rugby before becoming a coach for Colomiers Rugby and Castres Olympique.

René Deleris died on 27 December 2022, at the age of 96.

References

1926 births
2022 deaths
French rugby union players
Sportspeople from Tarn (department)